Andrew Heffernan (born 18 June 1975 in Hong Kong) is a Dutch equestrian, living in Nantwich, Cheshire. At the 2012 Summer Olympics he competed in the Individual eventing and team eventing.

References

External links
 

1975 births
Living people
Dutch male equestrians
Olympic equestrians of the Netherlands
Equestrians at the 2012 Summer Olympics
21st-century Dutch people